Slovan is an unincorporated community in the town of Casco, Kewaunee County, Wisconsin, United States. It is located at the interestion of County Trunk Highway T (CTH-T) and CTH-E.

Gallery

References

Unincorporated communities in Kewaunee County, Wisconsin
Unincorporated communities in Wisconsin